Barbara Joan Brunton Gibb (13 October 1927 – 29 June 2014), from around 1949 professionally known as Barbara Brunton, was an Australian actress of stage and radio, active between 1940 and 1952.

History
Brunton was born in 1927, the daughter of actress Ethel Lang and theatre impresario, teacher and actor James Brunton Gibb. Barbara was brought up at Lenore Street, Five Dock, Sydney, educated at Fort Street High School, before starting an entertainment career as a radio and stage actress, associated with Doris Fitton's Independent Theatre and the Mercury Theatre professionally under the name Barbara Brunton.

In 1950 Michael Pate and his wife, Bud Tingwell and Brunton had ideas of forming a film production company, but nothing came of it. She was engaged to Tingwell in December 1950, but nothing more was heard of that engagement either.

Brunton left Australia in October 1952 and married journalist Stuart Lindsay Revill  (1929–2019)on Long Island, New York in December 1952. He was for four years head of the ABC's American office in New York, then head of the ABC's Europe office, London.
Actress Kate Revill was a daughter.

Brunton died on 29 June 2014, aged 86.

Her sister, Judith Wendy Brunton Gibb (15 October 1925 – ), known as Wendy Gibb, and brother Peter Brunton Gibb (1924–2011) were juvenile leads with the BSA Players in the 1930s.

Selected appearances
Stage
Housemaster by Ian Hay at Minerva Theatre 1940
as Wendy in Peter Pan at Minerva Theatre 1946
Black Chiffon by Lesley Storm at the Independent Theatre 1952
The Witch by John Masefield at the Mercury Theatre
Radio
in My Favorite Wife Lux Radio Theatre starring Jack Davey prod. Harry Dearth 1940
as bigot's daughter in Deep are the Roots by James Gow and Arnaud d'Usseau 1947
as Anne Ridd in Lorna Doone serial on ABC radio 1949
regular in "Aunt Jenny's Real Life Stories" series ("Aunt Jenny" was her mother, Ethel Lang)
as Sheila in An Inspector Calls radio serial
as Bernadette in an adaptation of The Song of Bernadette by Franz Werfel in Lux Radio Theatre 1949
The Queen's Husband Caltex Theatre 1949
as June in Funny Face George Gershwin 1950Quiet Weekend Who Lies There by Philip Johnson with Gordon Chater, Nancye Stewart in Lux Radio Theatre 1950Rosemary by Elaine Sterne CarringtonThe Madwoman of Chaillot by Jean GiraudouxFront Page Girl by William Morum and William Dinner 1951Night Beat Saturday night drama seriesMine Own Executioner 1952The Adventures of Rocky Starr Sci-fi serial on 3DBThe Blue Lamp Caltex TheatreBlue Hills'', long running ABC serial, as "Sally"; succeeded in 1952 by June Salter.

Connection, if any, between Barbara and her fellow actress Dorothy Brunton (1890–1977) has not yet been found. 
Dorothy's father was John Brunton (c. 1848– 22 July 1909), born in Scotland.
Barbara's grandfather was James Gibb ( –c. 1949) and married Mary Brunton ( –1952) on 4 July 1891. 
Barbara's father James Gibb (13 January 1897 – 28 June 1968) changed his name to James Brunton Gibb before he married Ethel Isabel Lang (1902 – November 1995) on 1 September 1923.

References 

Australian radio actresses
1927 births
2014 deaths